Pipping may refer to:

 Pipping (animal behavior), the process of breaking open an eggshell using an egg tooth
 Pipping (crime), any intentional unauthorized absence from compulsory schooling
 Pipping (family), Finnish noble family number 207